Vanasundari is a 1951 Indian Tamil-language film directed by T. R. Raghunath, starring P. U. Chinnappa, T. R. Rajakumari, T. S. Balaiah and S. Varalakshmi.

Plot 
Prince Gunasagaran hates his father Marthandan, king of Neelapuri as he, in spite of his age, spends his time in entertainment without concern for people. Marthandan chases Gunasagaran out of the country. Gunasagaran and his friend Adhi Medhavi goes to another country. There, a cruel younger brother of the king,  Kapaleekaran rules after killing his elder brother. His paramour Leela is virtually ruling the State. Vanasundari, the king's daughter is in custody. Adhi Medhavi is imprisoned on false charge of theft. Gunasagaran meets Vanasundari in the jungle. Both exchange their tale of woes. Gunasagaran promises to rescue her. After many twists and turns the story has a happy ending.

Cast 

Male cast
P. U. Chinnappa as Prince Gunasagaran
T. S. Balaiah as Kapaleekaran
R. Balasubramaniam
D. Balasubramaniam
M. G. Chakrapani
N. S. Krishnan as Adhi Medhavi
Kaka Radhakrishnan
C. V. V. Panthulu
M. S. Karuppaiah
Pulimoottai Ramaswami
Kulathu Mani

Female cast
T. R. Rajakumari as Vanasundari
S. Varalakshmi
T. A. Mathuram
C. T. Rajakantham
T. V. Kumudhini
T. A. Jayalakshmi
Dance
Lalitha-Padmini
C. R. Rajakumari

Production 
The film was produced by SM. Letchumanan Chettiar, a notable personality in the Tamil film industry in the 1950s. He was the first person to print and distribute handbills in Tamil and the first person to use cars such as Buick, Chevrolet, Studebaker and Dodge in Chennai. Due to some legal problems, his name was never credited in any of his films and only the name of his production banner "Krishna Pictures" appeared in the credits.

Soundtrack 
The music was composed by S. V. Venkatraman and C. R. Subburaman. Lyrics were penned by Udumalai Narayana Kavi and Kambadasan. Singers are  P. U. Chinnappa, T. R. Rajakumari, S. Varalakshmi, N. S. Krishnan and T. A. Madhuram.  Playback singers are D. K. Pattammal, P. A. Periyanayaki, K. V. Janaki and P. Leela.

D. K. Pattammal sang Naadu Chezhithida song off-screen.

References

External links 
 

1950s Tamil-language films
1951 films
Films directed by T. R. Raghunath
Films scored by S. V. Venkatraman
Films scored by C. R. Subbaraman